The Jehol Diary (Yeolha Ilgi) is the work of the Joseon dynasty silhak scholar Bak Jiwon, written in classical Chinese. Bak, also known by his pen name of Yeon'am (燕巖), made an extensive tour of what was then the northern territory of the Chinese Qing Empire, including Shenyang, Beijing and Rehe Province (formerly romanized as Jehol), in 1780, in the company of his cousin. Bak's cousin had been dispatched to the Qing imperial court by the Joseon king Jeongjo to attend the 70th birthday celebrations of the Qianlong Emperor. 

As the title suggests, the Yeolha Ilgi (the result of the trip) takes the form of a travelogue. However, the scope of the diary is vast, covering such disparate topics as history, customs, natural surroundings, politics, economics, and poetry. Both the scope of the work and the quality of its writing have earned it a place as a masterpiece and an important source for Chinese and Korean historians. A partial English translation was published in 2010 under the title The Jehol Diary.

Contents
The Yeolha Ilgi is divided into twenty-six chapters in ten volumes. The chapter headings are as follows:

Prologue (서 序)

1. Dogangnok (도강록 渡江錄) 
This is a 15-day record from the Yalu River, which shows interest in the welfare of the use of ligature and bricks.

2. Seonggyeong japji (성경잡지 盛京雜識) 
This is a five-day collection of events ranging from ten years old to a small Mt. blacksand.

3. Ilsin supil (일신수필 馹汛隨筆) 
It is described around the site of the bridge from Shingwangnyeong to Sanhaigwan.

4. Gwannae jeongsa (관내정사 關內程史) 
It is a record from Sanhaigwan to Yeongyeong. In particular, it features a story about Baek-I and Sukje, and a story 'Hojil'

5. Makpuk haengjeongnok (막북행정록 漠北行程錄) 
It is a five-day record from the Yeongyeong to Yeolha.

6. Taehak yugwannok (태학유관록 太學留館錄) 
Lt is a discussion with Chinese scholars about the theory of sturaculture while staying in Taehak.

7. Guoe imun (구외이문 口外異聞) 
It is sixty kinds of stories heard outside the Old North door.

8. Hwanyeon dojungnok (환연도중록 還燕道中錄) 
It describes the transportation system as a six-day record that returns to the Yeongyeong from heat.

9. Geumnyo socho (금료소초 金蓼少抄)

10. Okgap yahwa (옥갑야화 玉匣夜話)

11. Hwangdo giryak (황도기략 黃圖記略)

12. Alseong toesul (알성퇴술 謁聖退述)

13. Angyeopgi (앙엽기 像葉記)

14. Gyeon'gae rok (경개록 傾盖錄)

15. Hwan'gyo mundap (황교문답 黃敎問答)

16. Haengjae jamnok (행재잡록 行在雜錄)

17. Banseon simal (반선시말 班禪始末)

18. Huibon myeongmok (희본명목 戱本名目)

19. Chal simnyunpo (찰십륜포 札什倫布)

20. Mangyangnok (망양록 忘羊錄)

21. Simsepyeon (심세편 審勢篇)

22. Gokjeong pildam (곡정필담 鵠汀筆談)

23. Dongnan seoppil (동란섭필 銅蘭涉筆)

24. Sanjang japgi (산장잡기 山莊雜技)

25. Hwanhuigi (환희기 幻戱記)

26. Piseorok (피서록 避署錄)

References

Korean books
Books about China
18th-century books
Chinese-language literature of Korea
Joseon dynasty works